The 1951 Washington State Cougars football team was an American football team that represented Washington State College during the 1951 college football season. Second-year head coach Forest Evashevski led the team to a 4–3 mark in the Pacific Coast Conference (PCC) and 7–3 overall.

Three home games were played on campus in Pullman at Rogers Field, and two in Spokane, both at night. The Cougars defeated rival Washington by two points for their first win in Seattle in 21 years, and were in the top twenty in both final polls.

After the season, Evashevski left for Iowa in early January,   and backs coach Al Kircher was promoted the following week.

Schedule

References

External links
 Game program: Santa Clara vs. WSC at Spokane – September 29, 1951
 Game program: Oklahoma A&M vs. WSC at Spokane – October 6, 1951
 Game program: California at WSC – October 13, 1951
 Game program: Oregon at WSC – October 27, 1951
 Game program: Montana at WSC – Montana 17, 1951

Washington State
Washington State Cougars football seasons
Washington State Cougars football